The 2001–02 Macedonian Football Cup was the 10th season of Macedonia's football knockout competition. FK Pelister were the defending champions, having won their first title. The 2001–02 champions were FK Pobeda who won their first title as well.

Competition calendar

First round
Matches were played on 5 August 2001.

|colspan="3" style="background-color:#97DEFF" align=center|5 August 2001

|}

Second round
The first legs were played on 12 September and second were played on 19 September 2001.

|}

Quarter-finals
The first legs were played on 17 October and second were played on 9 December 2001.

|}

Semi-finals
The first legs were played on 3 April and the second were played on 15 May 2002.

Summary

|}

Matches

Pobeda won 3–0 on aggregate.

2–2 on aggregate. Cementarnica 55 won on away goals.

Final

See also
2001–02 Macedonian First Football League
2001–02 Macedonian Second Football League

External links
 2001–02 Macedonian Football Cup at rsssf.org
 Official Website
 Macedonian Football

Macedonia
Cup
Macedonian Football Cup seasons